Pavine may refer to:
 Pavine (dance), a slow processional dance common in Europe during the 16th century
 Pavine (molecule), an alkaloid